Bastian Reinhardt (born 19 November 1975 in Ludwigslust) is a former German footballer. He is the currently managing the Under-17 squad of Hamburger SV.

Career 
Reinhardt began his career 1983 with Empor Grabow/Grabower FC and joined 1. FC Magdeburg in 1992. He left Magdeburg after two years and moved to Hamburg where he joined VfL Hamburg 93. Reinhardt played three years for VfL Hamburg 93 and moved in the summer of 1997 to Hannover 96. In his three years with Hannover 96 he played 58 matches and scored four goals. From 2000 to 2003 Reinhardt played for Arminia Bielefeld 99 matches, scoring eight goals. After the 2002–03 season he transferred to Hamburger SV where he left after six years in May 2009 and was re-signed on 17 July 2009. On 24 May 2010, Hamburger SV announced that Reinhardt would be taking over the vacant post of sportdirector, and would therefore be ending his active career in professional football.

Honours
Hamburger SV
DFL-Ligapokal: 2003
UEFA Intertoto Cup: 2005

References

External links
 

1975 births
Living people
People from Ludwigslust
People from Bezirk Schwerin
German footballers
Footballers from Mecklenburg-Western Pomerania
Arminia Bielefeld players
Hannover 96 players
Hamburger SV players
1. FC Magdeburg players
Bundesliga players
2. Bundesliga players
Association football defenders